The tournament wasn't played last year, no defending champions were declared. Martina Hingis and Anna Kournikova were the last champions at the 2000 edition, but none competed this year. Eventually, Hingis retired from professional tennis in February 2003, while Kournikova played her last professional match in April 2003, losing to Conchita Martínez at Charleston due to an injury.

Martina Navratilova and Lisa Raymond won the title by defeating Cara Black and Rennae Stubbs 6–3, 6–4 in the final.

Seeds

Draw

Draw

References

External links
 Official results archive (ITF)
 Official results archive (WTA)

2003 Women's Doubles
Advanta Championships – Doubles
Sports in Philadelphia
Tennis in Pennsylvania